The View From Here is Bob Bennett's seventh album, and is the third release in Signpost Music's "Livingroom Series" releases. Bob dedicated this release to his mother, Betty Jane Bennett.  As originally envisioned, the CD's release was to have included a CD booklet insert with notes from Bob about each song; however, cost constraints prevented this from occurring.

Track listing
All songs written by Bob Bennett, except where noted.

"The View From Here" (Bob Bennett & Tom Prasada-Rao) – 3:43
"Defiant Lamb" – 4:46
"A Life That Is Not My Own" – 2:33
"Still Rolls The Stone Prelude" – 1:51
"Still Rolls The Stone" – 3:35
"The Kings Of Summer Street" (Bob Bennett & Don Henry) – 3:53
"The Communion Rail" – 1:58
"Lord Of The Past" – 4:39
"We Were The Kings" – 5:39
"Heart Of Hearts" (Mark Heard) – 3:38
"Man Of The Tombs" – 5:59
"All Hail The Power Of Jesus' Name" (words: Edward Perronet; music: Oliver Holden; arrangement: Bob Bennett) – 3:47

Personnel
Bob Bennett – acoustic guitar, vocals, composer 
Steve Bell – producer, background vocals, mandolin
Dave Zeglinski – producer, recording, mixing, mastering
Vince Gatti – assistant engineer
Gilles Fournier – acoustic bass
Greg Lowe – cello arrangements
Carolyn Nagelberg – cello
Ron Holldorson – dobro
Daniel Roy – percussion

Release history
The View From Here was released by Signpost Music in 2002 and is distributed in Canada by Signpost Music and in the USA by Grassroots Music.

References

External links
 Bob's original notes, written for the (unpublished) CD booklet.

Bob Bennett (singer-songwriter) albums
2002 albums